The 1944–45 season was the 6th year of wartime football by Rangers.

Results
All results are written with Rangers' score first.

Southern League

Southern League Cup

See also
 1944–45 in Scottish football
 1944–45 Southern League Cup (Scotland)

Rangers F.C. seasons
Rangers
Scottish football championship-winning seasons